Mass media in the Republic of the Congo are severely restricted by many factors, including widespread illiteracy and economic underdevelopment.

The Congolese depend primarily on radio for information. This is mainly due to high illiteracy rates. Access to other forms of media outside the capital is poor. Even Pointe-Noire, the second largest city and the country's economic capital, does not have its own local newspaper.  Internet access is very limited, and most citizens have no access to computers in any case.

The public radio and television broadcaster in the Republic of the Congo is Radiodiffusion Television Congolaise. Private radio and television stations are allowed. The country has one press agency, Agence Congolaise d'Information, which is a public agency.

Freedom of speech
Freedom of speech is severely curtailed in the Republic of the Congo. During 2009 national elections, a number of reporters from major international press organizations, including France 24, BBC and Radio France International, were harassed, physically attacked by police and soldiers, and had equipment seized.

Print
There are a handful of print and online newspapers in the Republic of the Congo. All newspapers are based in Brazzaville, and publish in French:

 ACI Actualité, issued by Agence Congolaise d'Information (defunct?)
 Aujourd'hui (est. 1991) (defunct?)
 Brazza News 
 Le Choc 
 Les Dépêches de Brazzaville 
 Les Echos du Congo 
 La Griffe 
 L'Humanitaire 
 Journal de Brazza(fr)
 Mweti  (defunct?)
 Le Nouveau Regard 
 L'Observateur 
 La Semaine Africaine (est. 1952), a religious publication of the Roman Catholic Church
 Talassa 
 Le Tam Tam 
 La Vérité

Television
 TV Congo (est. 1962), operated by governmental Radiodiffusion Télévision Congolaise

Radio
In addition to Congolese radio stations, stations from nearby Kinshasa, in the Democratic Republic of the Congo, can be received in the Brazzaville. Rebroadcasts of the BBC World Service, Radio France Internationale, and the Voice of America are available.

 Canal FM (est. 1977), Brazzaville community station; before 2002 called Radio Rurales du Congo
 Radio Brazzaville (est. 1999), government operated local station for the capitol
 Radio Congo, government operated national station
 Radio Liberté (est. 1997), privately owned

Telecommunications

Fixed line telephone infrastructure in the Republic of the Congo is very limited; fewer than 1 in 100 citizens have a fixed telephone line. Mobile phone communication has grown rapidly, and by 2011 more than 50 in 100 citizens had a mobile phone.  245,000 citizens are estimated to be Internet users, out of a total population of more than 3,800,000.

See also

References

Bibliography

External links
 

 
Congo, Republic
Congo, Republic